The Treatise on Invertebrate Paleontology (or TIP) published by the Geological Society of America and the University of Kansas Press, is a definitive multi-authored work of some 50 volumes, written by more than 300 paleontologists, and covering every phylum, class, order, family, and genus of fossil and extant (still living) invertebrate animals.  The prehistoric invertebrates are described as to their taxonomy, morphology, paleoecology, stratigraphic and paleogeographic range.  However, taxa with no fossil record whatsoever have just a very brief listing.

Publication of the decades-long Treatise on Invertebrate Paleontology is a work-in-progress; and therefore it is not yet complete: For example, there is no volume yet published regarding the post-Paleozoic era caenogastropods (a molluscan group including the whelk and periwinkle). Furthermore, every so often, previously published volumes of the Treatise are revised.

Evolution of the project 
Raymond C. Moore, the project's founder and first editor, originally envisioned this Treatise in invertebrate paleontology as comprising just three large volumes, and totaling only three thousand pages.

The project began with work on a few, mostly slim volumes in which a single senior specialist in a distinct field of invertebrate paleozoology would summarize one particular group. As a result, each publication became a comprehensive compilation of everything known at that time for each group. Examples of this stage of the project are Part G. Bryozoa, by Ray S. Bassler (the first volume, published in 1953), and Part P. Arthropoda Part 2, the Chelicerata by Alexander Petrunkevitch (1955/1956).

Around 1959 or 1960, as more and larger invertebrate groups were being addressed, the incompleteness of the then-current state of affairs became apparent.  So several senior editors of the Treatise started major research programs to fill in the evident gaps.  Consequently, the succeeding volumes, while still maintaining the original format, began to change from being a set of single-authored compilations into being major research projects in their own right.  Newer volumes had a committee and a chief editor for each volume, with yet other authors and researchers assigned particular sections.  Museum collections that had not been previously described were studied; and sometimes new major taxonomic families—and even orders—had to be described.  More attention was given to transitional fossils and evolutionary radiation—eventually producing a much-more complete encyclopedia of invertebrate paleontology.

But even in the second set of volumes, the various taxa were still described and organized in a classical Linnaean sense.  The more-recent volumes began to introduce phylogenetic and cladistic ideas, along with new developments and discoveries in fields such as biogeography,  molecular phylogeny, paleobiology, and organic chemistry, so that the current edition of Brachiopoda (1997 to 2002) is classified according to a cladistic arrangement, with three subphyla and a large number of classes replacing the original two classes of Articulata and Inarticulata.

All these discoveries led to revisions and additional volumes.  Even those taxa already covered were expanded: Books such as those  regarding the Cnidaria (vol. F), the Brachiopoda (vol. H) and the Trilobita (vol. O) each went from one modest publication to three large volumes.  And yet another volume regarding the brachiopods (number five) was published in 2006.

Until 2007, the editor of the Treatise was Roger L. Kaesler at The Paleontological Institute at the University of Kansas in Lawrence, Kansas.

Layout of the articles 
From the beginning, the character of the Treatise volumes has followed and further developed the pattern of the classic Invertebrate Paleontology written by Moore, Lalicker and Fischer (1953).

Following their lead, the Treatise includes in a typical article (a) a description of the basic anatomy of the modern members of each invertebrate group, (b) distinctive features of the fossils, (c) a comprehensive illustrated glossary of terms, (d) a short discussion of the evolutionary history of the group, (e) a stratigraphic range chart, done at the level of the major subdivision (lower, middle and upper) of each Geologic period.

This is followed by (f) a listing and technical description of every known genus, along with (g) geographic distribution (usually by continent only, but occasionally by country) and (h) stratigraphic range.

Next come (i) one or two representative species illustrated by line drawings (in the early volumes) or by black-and-white photographs (in subsequent volumes), each accompanied by an appropriate reference for that genus.  Furthermore, each Treatise article includes (j) the  date, authorship, and scientific history of the taxa.

Finally, there is (k) a comprehensive bibliography and list of references.  Not only that, but the more recent volumes and revisions also include (l) new fossil and phylogenetic discoveries, (m) advances in numerical and cladistic methods, (n) analysis of the group's genome, (o) its molecular phylogeny, and so on.

List of its volumes 
The following is an annotated list of the volumes already published (1953 to 2007) or volumes currently being prepared:

Introduction (A) and sub-metazoan Protista (B, C & D)

 Part A. Introduction: Fossilization (Taphonomy), Biogeography, & Biostratigraphy. xxiii + 569 pages, 169 figures, 1979.  . The original volume is out of print.
 Part B. Protoctista / Protista, Volume 1: Charophyta, Sub-volume 1, 2005.  . ---- Parts B through D refer to mostly one-celled, nucleated forms of life, typically fossilized due to their siliceous tests.  "Protista" and Protoctista" are nearly synonymous.
(Part B. Protoctista / Protista, Volume 1:  Chrysomonadida, Coccolithophorida, Charophyta, Diatomacea & Pyrrhophyta. Sub-volume 2  --- in preparation).
 Part C. Protista / Protoctista, Volume 2: Sarcodina, Chiefly "Thecamoebians" & Foraminiferida, Sub-volumes 1 and 2, xxxi + 900 p., 653 fig., 1964.  .
 Part D. Protista / Protoctista, Volume 3: Protozoa (Chiefly Radiolaria & Tintinnina), xii + 195 p., 92 fig., 1954. . The original volume is out of print.

Archaeocyatha and Porifera (E)

 Part E. Archaeocyatha & Porifera, xviii + 122 p., 89 fig., 1955. . The original volume is out-of-print.  ---- Part E refers to sponge-like animals, both calcareous and siliceous.
 Part E, Revised. Archaeocyatha, Volume 1, xxx + 158 p., 107 fig., 1972.  .
 Part E, Revised. Porifera, Volume 2:  Classes Demospongea, Lyssacinosa & Hexactinellida, xxvii + 349 p., 135 fig., 10 tables. 2003.  .
 Part E, Revised. Porifera, Volume 3:  Classes Demospongea, Hexactinellida, Heteractinida & Calcarea, xxxi + 872 p., 506 fig., 1 table, 2004.  .
Part E, Revised. Porifera, Volumes 4 & 5: liii + 1223 p., 665 figs., 2015. .

Cnidaria or Coelenterata (F)

 Part F. Coelenterata / Cnidaria, xvii + 498 p., 358 fig., 1956. . The original volume is out-of-print.  --- Part F refers to the corals and other cnidarians. Coelenterata is an outdated term for two now separated phyla, Cnidaria and Ctenophora (comb jellies).
 Part F. Coelenterata / Cnidaria, Supplement 1: Rugosa & Tabulata corals, xl + 762 p., 462 fig., 1981. .
 (Part F, Revised. Cnidaria / Coelenterata: Scleractinia corals --- volume in preparation).

Bryozoa (G)

 Part G. Bryozoa, xii + 253 p., 175 fig., 1953. . The original volume is out-of-print.  --- Part G refers to bryozoans, colonial animals also known as ectoprocts or moss animals.
 Part G, Revised. Bryozoa, Volume 1: Introduction, Order Cystoporata & Order Cryptostomata, xxvi + 625 p., 295 fig., 1983. .
 (Part G, Revised. Bryozoa --- additional volumes in preparation).

Brachiopoda (H)

 Part H. Brachiopoda, vol. 1 & 2, xxxii + 927 p., 746 fig., 1965. . The original volume is out-of-print.  --- Part H refers to brachiopods, shelled animals including living lamp shells.
 Part H, Revised. Brachiopoda, Volume 1: Introduction, xx + 539 p., 417 fig., 40 tables, 1997. .
 Part H, Revised. Brachiopoda, Volumes 2 and 3:  Sub-phyla Linguliformea, Craniiformea, &  Rhynchonelliformea (1st part: Classes Chileta, Obolellata, Kutorginata, Strophomenta & Rhynochonellata), xxx + 919 p., 616 fig., 17 tables, 2000. .
 Part H, Revised. Brachiopoda, Volume 4: Sub-phylum Rhynchonelliformea (2nd part: Orders Pentamerida, Rhynchonellida, Atrypida & Athrydida), ix + 768 pp., 484 fig., 3 tables, 2002 / 2005.   .
 Part H, Revised. Brachiopoda, Volume 5: Sub-phylum Rhynchonelliformea (3rd part: Orders Spiriferida, Spiriferinida, Thecideida, Terebratulida & Uncertain), xlvi + 631 pp., 398 fig., 2006. .
 Part H, Revised. Brachiopoda, Volume 6: Supplement, l + 956 pages, 461 figures (10 in color), 38 tables, 2007. .

Mollusca (I, J, K, L, M & N)

 Part I. Mollusca 1: Mollusca General Features, Scaphopoda, Amphineura, Monoplacophora, Gastropoda General Features, Archaeogastropoda, Mainly Paleozoic Caenogastropoda and Opisthobranchia), xxiii + 351 p., 216 fig., 1960. . The original volume is out-of-print. --- Parts I and J refer to primitive mollusks and gastropods (such as snails).
 (Part J, Mollusca 2: Paleozoic Gastropoda  --- volume in preparation).
 Part K. Mollusca 3: Cephalopoda General Features, Endoceratoidea, Actinoceratoidea, Nautiloidea, & Bactritoidea, xxviii + 519 p., 361 fig., 1964. . The original volume is out of print. --- Parts K and L refer to cephalopods with external shells, including ammonites and Nautilus-like creatures.
 (Part K, Revised. Mollusca 3: Nautiloidea --- volume in preparation).
 Part L. Mollusca 4: Ammonoidea, xxii + 490 p., 558 fig., 1957. . The original volume is out-of-print.
 Part L, Revised. Mollusca 4, Volume 2: Carboniferous and Permian Ammonoidea (Goniatitida and Prolecanitida), xxix + 258 p., 139 fig., 1 table, 2009. .
Part L, Revised. Mollusca 4, Volume 4: Cretaceous Ammonoidea, xx + 362 p., 216 fig., 1995 / 1996.  .
 (Part L, Revised. Mollusca 4: Paleozoic to Jurassic Ammonoidea --- additional volumes in preparation).
 (Part M. Mollusca 5: Coleoidea --- volume in preparation.  --- Part M includes coleoids (cephalopods without external shells) such as squids, cuttlefish, and extinct belemnoids).
 Part N. Mollusca 6: Bivalvia, Volumes 1 and 2 (of 3), xxxvii + 952 p., 613 fig., 1969. . The original volume is out of print. --- Part N refers to clams, oysters, scallops, mussels and other fossilized bivalves or pelecypods.
  Part N. Mollusca 6: Bivalvia, Volume 3: Oysters, iv + 272 p., 153 fig., 1971. .

Arthropoda (O, P, Q & R) 

 Part O. Arthropoda 1: Arthropoda General Features, Protarthropoda, Euarthropoda General Features, Trilobitomorpha, xix + 560 p., 415 fig., 1959. . The original volume is out-of-print. --- Part O refers to stem-arthropods including velvet worms (Onychophora), water bears (Tardigrada), and trilobites.
 Part O, Revised. Arthropoda 1, Volume 1: Trilobita: Introduction, Order Agnostida & Order Redlichiida, xxiv + 530 p., 309 fig., 1997.  .
 (Part O, Revised. Arthropoda 1: Trilobita --- additional volumes in preparation).
 Part P. Arthropoda 2: Chelicerata, Pycnogonida & Palaeoisopus, xvii + 181 p., 123 fig., 1955 / 1956.  .  --- Part P refers to extinct chelicerates including eurypterids (sea scorpions), xiphosurans (horseshoe crabs), pycnogonids (sea spiders), and arachnids.
 Part Q. Arthropoda 3: Crustacea & Ostracoda, xxiii + 442 p., 334 fig., 1961. .  --- Parts Q and R refer to crustaceans such as crabs, lobsters, and ostracods, as well as myriapods (millipedes and centipedes), and hexapods (such as insects).
 (Part Q, Revised. Arthropoda 3 --- in preparation).
 Part R. Arthropoda 4, Volumes 1 and 2: Crustacea (exclusive of Ostracoda), Myriapoda, & Hexapoda, xxxvi + 651 p., 397 fig., 1969. . The original volume is out-of-print.
 Part R. Arthropoda 4, Volumes 3 and 4: Hexapoda, xxii + 655 p., 265 fig., 1992. . The original volume is out-of-print.
 (Part R, Revised. Arthropoda 4 --- in preparation).

Echinodermata (S, T & U) 

 Part S. Echinodermata 1, Volumes 1 and 2: Echinodermata General Features, Homalozoa, Crinozoa (exclusive of Crinoidea), xxx + 650 p., 400 fig., 1967 / 1968. . The original volume is out-of-print.  ---- Part S refers to primitive sessile echinoderms.
 Part T. Echinodermata 2, Volumes 1-3: Crinoidea, xxxviii + 1,027 p., 619 fig., 1978. . The original volume is out-of-print. ---- Part T refers to crinoids, a group of echinoderms including living sea lilies.
 Part T, Revised.  Echinodermata 2, Volume 3: Crinoidea, xxix + 261 p., 112 fig., 2011. .
 Part U. Echinodermata 3, Volumes 1 and 2: Asterozoans & Echinozoans, xxx + 695 p., 534 fig., 1966. .  ---- Part U refers to asterozoans (including sea stars and brittle stars) and echinozoans (including sea urchins and sea cucumbers).

Graptolithina (V) 

 Part V. Graptolithina, with sections on Enteropneusta & Pterobranchia, xvii + 101 p., 72 fig., 1955. . The original volume is out-of-print. --- Part V refers to the extinct graptolites, as well as to other hemichordates.
 Part V, Revised. Graptolithina, with sections on Enteropneusta & Pterobranchia, xxxii + 163 p., 109 fig., 1970 / 1971.  .
 (Part V, Revised. Graptolithina—in preparation)

Miscellanea and Conodonta (W) 

 Part W. Miscellanea: Conodonts, Conoidal shells of uncertain affinities, Worms, Trace Fossils, & problematica, xxv + 259 p., 153 fig., 1962. .  --- Miscellaneous invertebrate fossils, including trace fossils and conodonts, which may be primitive vertebrates.
 Part W, Revised. Miscellanea: Trace Fossils and problematica, xxi + 269 p., 110 fig., 1975. The original volume is out-of-print. .
 (Part W, Revised. Trace Fossils --- in preparation)
 Part W, Miscellanea, Supplement 2: Conodonta, xxviii + 202 p., frontis., 122 fig., 1981.  .

References 

 
 Ladd, Harry S., editor, (1957 / 1971), Treatise on Ecology and Paleoecology, Volume 2: Paleoecology.  Boulder, Colorado: Geological Society of America; and Washington, D.C. : Waverly Press.
 Moore, Raymond C., and other editors (1953 to 2006, and continuing ), Treatise on Invertebrate Paleontology, Parts A through W. Boulder, Colorado: Geological Society of America; and Lawrence, Kansas: University of Kansas Press.
 Ronald Singer (1999), Encyclopedia of Paleontology (London, England: Routledge), 1,467 pages.

External links 
 Treatise on Invertebrate Paleontology, Volumes A through W, 1953 to the present.: Home page sponsored by Geological Society of America and The Paleontological Institute at the University of Kansas.

Geology books
Paleontology books
Invertebrate paleozoology
Zoological literature
Encyclopedias of science
Treatises